Thomas Albion Alderson (13 November 1843 – 5 February 1902) was an organist and composer based in Newcastle-upon-Tyne.

Life

He married Elizabeth Mary Eltringham (26 April 1843 -  February 1912) on 24 June 1867 in Holy Trinity Church, South Shields. They had 6 children.
Charles Frederick Alderson (b. 1868)
Albion Percy Alderson (1871 - 4 March 1936)
Wilfred Ernest Alderson (3 June 1873 – 3 September 1949)
Reginald Alderson (b.1879)
Florence Alderson (b.1875)
Lilian Maud Alderson (13 June 1876 – 29 March 1923)

Appointments

Organist at St Andrew's Church, Newcastle upon Tyne 1867 – 1902

Compositions

He wrote many songs and pieces for piano including
Dance of the Naiads, for the Pianoforte (1869)
Dreamland romance for the Pianoforte (1869)
May Blossoms, morceaux de salon pour Piano (1869)
Smiles and Tears. Song  (1869)
Tarantella for the Pianoforte (1869)
Hawarden March for the Pianoforte (1869)
Rosabelle, grand galop de concert pour Piano (1869)
Spring Flowers, mazurka for the Pianoforte (1869)
Starlight, notturno for the Pianoforte (1869)
The Streamlet, sketch for the Pianoforte (1870)
Carine, polka brillante for the Pianoforte (1870)
Rosina, valse brillante pour Piano (1870)
Go ask the bird to live with thee. Song (1870)
Hilda, serenade for the Pianoforte (1871)
Violets, mazurka for the Pianoforte (1871)
The Willow Song [begins: "Down the River] (1871)
Holly Berries. Song, words by F. Dudley (1873)
My Song shall be of mercy and judgement. Anthem (1882)
Dreamland. Romance for pianoforte & violin (1884)

References

1843 births
1902 deaths
English organists
British male organists
English composers
19th-century English musicians
Musicians from Newcastle upon Tyne
19th-century British male musicians
19th-century organists